Deuce Mob is a hip hop/Chicano Rap/Southwest Hip Hop group from Denver, Colorado. The group was established in 1990 and hails from the northwest area of the city. Deuce Mob is known as Colorado's first rap group to sign a major record deal back in 1993 with Thump Records and Universal Records. The group's first international release in 1996, Going Solo, was met with critical acclaim throughout the southwest and west coast, as well as in the midwest. Upcoming songs from the group are This is the Way ft. Kid Frost and Rappin' 4-Tay, Year Round Hustle, and Bubble Gum ft. Devin the Dude.

References

American rappers of Mexican descent
American hip hop groups
Musical groups from Denver